Burra Voe (Broch Bay) is sheltered bay (voe) at the southeast corner of the island of Yell.

The village of Burravoe (HU525795) is on the north coast of Burra Voe.

Sources
 This article is based on http://shetlopedia.com/Burra_Voe GFDL wiki.

Voes of Shetland